Adrenalin/Distant Dreams (Part Two) is a single by Throbbing Gristle. It was simultaneously released with Subhuman/Something Came Over Me. It was sold in a camouflage printed plastic bag and reached No. 26 in the UK Indie Chart.

Artwork
As with Subhuman/Something Came Over Me, the single contains two distinctive black-and-white photographs, the first of a storefront and the second of an unidentified interior. A 'TG' label is printed on both sides, with each side's respective song and an Industrial Records catalog number. The messages "Second Attempt" and "rident Rool" are scratched in on the A-side.

Track listing
Side A:
"Adrenalin" – 3:59
Side B:
"Distant Dreams (Part Two)" – 5:30

Charts

References

External links
Discogs entry

Throbbing Gristle songs
1980 singles
1980 songs